Project Runway All Stars (Season 4) is the fourth season of the Project Runway spin-off series Project Runway All Stars. It features 14 designers from previous seasons of the original series with Alyssa Milano returning as both host and judge. TV fashion correspondent and Marie Claire’s Senior Fashion Editor Zanna Roberts Rassi returns to mentor contestants.

Lifetime Network's website, mylifetime.com, reveals the winner's prize package as: a chance to create a capsule collection with QVC and appear during QVC’s Spring Fashion Week programming; a fashion spread in Marie Claire and a position at the magazine as Contributing Editor for one year; a special guest stay at CHI Haircare's International conference in Cancun, Mexico, plus product and staff for an entire year of runway shows; from Mary Kay, an entire year’s worth of beauty products for fashion shows and professional makeup artist services for his/her debut show; a cash prize of $150,000 and a complete custom sewing studio to launch his/her winning line from Brother Sewing and Embroidery.

Judges
In addition to Alyssa Milano both Georgina Chapman and Isaac Mizrahi return as judges for this season. Some of the celebrity guest judges for Project Runway All Stars Season 4 are Emmy® Award nominee Laverne Cox of Orange Is the New Black, Emmy winner Debra Messing who has a new television show The Mysteries of Laura, Modern Family Ariel Winter, Academy Award® winner Mira Sorvino, singer Nicole Scherzinger, Emmy nominated host Cat Deeley, reality stars Snooki and JWoww, celebrity photographer Nigel Barker and QVC® Program Host Lisa Robertson. Fashion Designers Betsey Johnson, Michael Bastian, Elie Tahari and Ivanka Trump will serve as guest judges. "Project Runway" judges Nina Garcia and Zac Posen will make special appearances.

Designers
Names and locales:

 
: March also competed on the "Project Runway All-Star Challenge", and was third runner-up.

Designer Progress 

 The designer won season four of Project Runway All Stars
 The designer won the challenge.
 The designer came in second but did not win the challenge.
 The designer had one of the highest scores for the challenge but did not win.
 The designer had one of the lowest scores for the challenge but was not eliminated.
 The designer was in the bottom two but was not eliminated.
 The designer lost the challenge and was eliminated from the competition.

Models
Brianna Benavides
Kristina Borgyugova
Kasey Clare
Jennifer Daniel
Bruna Marx
Collene Mills
Sharlene Radlein
Alyona Shishmareva
Jennifer Stosz
Nastasia Scott
Sydney Mills

Episodes

Episode 1: Made in Manhattan 
Original airdate: October 30, 2014

 All-star designers create fashions inspired by New York's uptown or downtown scene in the Season 4 premiere.
 Guest Judge: Ivanka Trump
 WINNER: Fabio 
 ELIMINATED: Patricia

Episode 2: The Art of Construction 
Original airdate: November 6, 2014

 A construction site inspires the designers to create feminine styles from masculine materials.
 Guest Judge: Snooki, JWoww, & Elie Tahari
 WINNER: Justin
 ELIMINATED: Alexandria

Episode 3: Something Wicked This Way Comes 
Original airdate: November 13, 2014

 The designers have access to Broadway's "Wicked" to fashion couture-inspired styles.
 Guest Judge: Betsey Johnson (sitting in for  Georgina Chapman)  & Ariel Winter
 WINNER: Sonjia
 ELIMINATED: Chris
Note: This episode the designers were tasked with creating a dress that represented a "good" or "wicked" theme.  They were randomly paired to design against each other in Fashion Face-offs, with a "good" design going against a "wicked" design.  The match-ups were:

 The designer won their face off.

Episode 4: Wear Your Heart on Your Sleeve 
Original airdate: November 20, 2014

 The all-star clothiers spin out flashy party dresses inspired by their personal relationships.
 Guest Judge: Nina Garcia, Seth Aaron Henderson (sitting in for  Georgina Chapman), & Danielle Bernstein
 WINNER: Helen
 ELIMINATED: Kate

Episode 5: Designing for the Duchess 
Original airdate: December 4, 2014

 The clothiers meet British royalty in London as inspiration to create winter fashions.
 Guest Judge: Debra Messing (sitting in for  Georgina Chapman)  & Karen Elson
 WINNER: Fabio
 ELIMINATED: Benjamin

Episode 6: Luck Be a Lady 
Original airdate: December 11, 2014

 A fashion gamble tests the all-star designers.
 Guest Judge: Michael Bastian
 WINNER: Sonjia
 ELIMINATED: Gunnar

Episode 7: Mix and Match.com 
Original airdate: December 18, 2014

 The clothiers fashion looks for dating-site singles.
 Guest Judge: Laverne Cox 
 WINNER: Fabio
 ELIMINATED: None

Episode 8: Making a Splash 
Original airdate: January 8, 2015

 The designers create elegant resort wear with swimsuits. Before that, they plunge into a major challenge when they must collect their fabric from under the water.
 Guest Judge: Nigel Barker 
 WINNER: Justin
 ELIMINATED: Samantha

Episode 9: Sketching with Sharks 
Original airdate: January 15, 2015

 The designers must use marine life as inspiration for avant-garde fashion. One designer doubles the budget by swimming with sharks.
 Guest Judge: Nicole Scherzinger 
 WINNER: Dmitry
 ELIMINATED: Justin

Episode 10: Versatile Tops and Bottoms 
Original airdate: January 22, 2015

 New York City's Times Square is the backdrop when the designers learn about the business of fashion and style combinations.
 Guest Judge: Lisa Robertson & George Kotsiopoulos
 WINNER: Sonjia
 ELIMINATED: Jay

Episode 11: Always the Bridesmaid 
Original airdate: January 29, 2015

 The designers must use Marchesa's showroom as inspiration to create bridesmaids' dresses for a wedding ceremony on the runway.
 Guest Judge: Cat Deeley
 WINNER: Helen
 ELIMINATED: Fabio

Episode 12: Some Like It Hot Dog 
Original airdate: February 5, 2015
Viewers (million): 1.66

 Red-carpet gowns are fashioned as inspired by the beauty of Marilyn Monroe. Also: A Hollywood legend visits the workroom.
 Guest Judge: Sophia Amoruso
 WINNER: Dmitry
 ELIMINATED: Michelle

Episode 13: 4 Seasons in One Finale 
Original airdate: February 12, 2015
Viewers (millions): 1.57

 The winner is crowned in the Season 4 finale. Included: The finalists create collections representing the four seasons of the year.
 Guest Judge: Mira Sorvino & Zac Posen
 WINNER: Dmitry
 ELIMINATED: Helen & Sonjia

References

External links 
Chris March Official Website

All Stars Season 04
2014 American television seasons
2015 American television seasons
2014 in fashion
2015 in fashion
2014 in American television
2015 in American television